{{Automatic taxobox
| image = E lavarackorum 2.jpg
| image_caption = Elseya lavarackorum
| taxon = Elseya
| authority = Gray, 1867
| type_species = Chelymys dentata
| type_species_authority = Gray, 1867 (subsequent designation)
| subdivision_ranks = Subgenera
| synonyms = Chelymys 
Euchelymys 
Pelocomastes 
| synonyms_ref = <ref name=ttwg>Turtle Taxonomy Working Group [van Dijk PP, Iverson JB, Rhodin AGJ, Shaffer HB, Bour R] (2014). "Turtles of the world, 7th edition: annotated checklist of taxonomy, synonymy, distribution with maps, and conservation status". In: Rhodin AGJ, Pritchard PCH, van Dijk PP, Saumure RA, Buhlmann KA, Iverson JB, Mittermeier RA (Editors) (2014). Conservation Biology of Freshwater Turtles and Tortoises: A Compilation Project of the IUCN/SSC Tortoise and Freshwater Turtle Specialist Group. Chelonian Research Monographs 5 (7): 000.329–479, doi:10.3854/ crm.5.000.checklist.v7.2014.</ref>
}}Elseya is a genus of large side-necked turtles, commonly known as Australian snapping turtles, in the family Chelidae. Species in the genus Elseya are found in river systems in northern and northeastern Australia and throughout the river systems of New Guinea. They are identified by the presence of alveolar ridges on the triturating surfaces of the mouth and the presence of a complex bridge strut.

The Australian snapping turtles are largely herbivorous, with specialized mouth structures for eating fruits. However, they will eat animal products if opportunity arises. The various species can be found in large numbers where they are still abundant, e.g., Northern Territory of Australia. However, a number of the populations have become increasingly rare, and some are now listed as endangered.

Systematics

Etymology
John Edward Gray created the generic name, Elseya, in 1867 in honour of Dr. Joseph Ravenscroft Elsey, a surgeon-naturalist on the Gregory Expedition that traversed northern Australia from the Victoria River to Moreton Bay in 1855–1856.

List of species
The genus was originally described by Gray in 1867 with the type species being set as Elseya dentata. The fossil genus Pelocomastes was later synonymised with this genus. Following the recent revisions of this genus, the latisternum group has been moved to the new genus Myuchelys. The remaining species of this genus have additionally been separated into three subgenera, Elseya, Pelocomastes, and Hanwarachelys, and the species redistributed among them.

Extinct species

There are two identified extinct species of Elseya. Elseya nadibajagu  and Elseya uberrima  are prehistoric species known only from fossils. E. lavarackorum was initially believed also to be a fossil taxon, but later discovered to be still extant. Elseya nadibajagu is a Pliocene species of extinct Australian snapping turtle, described from the Bluff Downs region of Queensland, Australia.; whereas Elseya uberrima is a Pleistocene species described from the Darling Downs region of Queensland, Australia.

Notes

References

External links and further reading
 Gondwanan Turtle Site

 
Turtle genera
Taxa named by John Edward Gray
Taxonomy articles created by Polbot